Charles Paschal Telesphore Chiniquy (30 July 1809 – 16 January 1899) was a Canadian socio-political activist and former Roman Catholic priest who left the Roman Catholic Church and converted to Protestant Christianity, becoming a Presbyterian Evangelical minister. He rode the lecture circuit in the United States denouncing the Roman Catholic Church. His themes were that Roman Catholicism was Pagan, that Roman Catholics worshipped the Virgin Mary, and that its theology was anti-Christian.

Chiniquy founded the St. Anne Colony, a village located in Kankakee County, Illinois in 1851. Fifty Years in the Church of Rome, an extensive autobiographical account of his life and thoughts as a priest in the Roman Catholic Church, was written by Chiniquy and published in 1886. He warned of plots by the Vatican to take control of the United States by importing Roman Catholic immigrants from Ireland, Germany, and France, and suggested that the Vatican was behind the assassination of U.S. President Abraham Lincoln.

Biography
Chiniquy was born in 1809 to a French-Canadian family in the village of Kamouraska, Quebec. He lost his father at an early age and was adopted by his uncle. As a young man, Chiniquy studied to become a Roman Catholic priest at the Petit Seminaire (Little Seminary) in Nicolet, Quebec. He was ordained in 1833; after his ordination, he served his church in Quebec. During the 1840s, he led a campaign throughout Quebec against the consumption of alcohol and drunkenness.

Later he immigrated to Illinois in the United States. In 1855, Chiniquy was sued by a prominent Catholic layman named Peter Spink in Kankakee, Illinois. After the fall court term, Spink applied for a change of venue to the court in Urbana, Illinois. Chiniquy hired the then-lawyer Abraham Lincoln, the future 16th President of the United States, to defend him. The spring court action in Urbana was the highest profile libel suit in Lincoln's career. The case was ended in the fall court session by agreement.

Chiniquy clashed with the Bishop of Chicago, Anthony O'Regan, over the bishop's treatment of Roman Catholics in the city, particularly French Canadians. He declared that O'Regan was secretly backing Spink's suit against him. Chiniquy said that in 1856, O'Regan had threatened him with excommunication if he did not go to a new location where the bishop wanted to assign him. Several months later, The New York Times published a pastoral letter from O'Regan in which he stated that he had suspended Chiniquy. Since Chiniquy had continued his normal duties as a priest, the bishop excommunicated him by his letter; he vigorously disputed that he had been excommunicated, saying publicly that the bishop was mistaken. Chiniquy left the Roman Catholic Church in 1858, and subsequently converted to Protestant Christianity, becoming a Presbyterian Evangelical minister in 1860.

He asserted that Roman Catholicism was Pagan, that Roman Catholics worshipped the Virgin Mary, and that its theology was anti-Christian.  He warned of plots by the Vatican to take control of the United States by importing Roman Catholic immigrants from Ireland, Germany, and France. This was at a time of high immigration rates from those countries, in response to social and political upheaval (the Great Famine in Ireland and revolutions in Germany and France). Chiniquy claimed that he was falsely accused by his superiors (and that Abraham Lincoln had come to his rescue), that the American Civil War was a plot against the United States of America by the Vatican, and that the Vatican was behind the Confederate cause, and the assassination of U.S. President Lincoln, and that Lincoln's assassins were faithful Roman Catholics ultimately serving Pope Pius IX.

After leaving the Roman Catholic Church, Chiniquy dedicated his life to preach and evangelize among his fellow French Canadians, as well as other people in Canada and the United States, in order to convert them from Roman Catholicism to Protestant Christianity. He wrote a number of books and tracts expressing his criticism and views on the alleged errors in the faith and practices of the Roman Catholic Church. His two most influential literary works are the autobiography Fifty Years in The Church of Rome and the polemical treatise The Priest, The Woman, and The Confessional. These books raised concerns in the United States about the influence of the Roman Catholic Church. According to one Canadian biographer, Chiniquy is Canada's best-selling author of all time. He joined the Orange Order and said of it: "I always found them staunch and true. I consider it a great honour to be an Orangeman. Every time I go on my knees I pray that God may bless them and make them as numerous and bright as the stars of the heaven above." He died in Montreal, Quebec, Canada on January 16, 1899.

To this day, some of Chiniquy's works are still promoted among Protestant Christians and Sola scriptura believers. One of his most well-known modern day followers was the American Fundamentalist cartoonist and comic book writer Jack Chick, notable for being the creator of the "Chick tracts"; he also published a comic-form adaptation of Chiniquy's autobiography Fifty Years in The Church of Rome, titled "The Big Betrayal". Chick strongly relied on Chiniquy's claims and books for writing his own anti-Catholic tracts.

St. Anne Colony
Chiniquy, then a Roman Catholic priest, left Canada in the wake of a series of scandals. He was offered a fresh start by James Oliver Van de Velde, Bishop of Chicago, after Ignace Bourget, Bishop of Montreal, asked him to leave in 1851. Chiniquy founded and settled in St. Anne Colony, a village located in Kankakee County, Illinois in 1851. Chiniquy was suspended on 19 August 1856, for public insubordination by Bishop Anthony O'Regan, Van de Velde's successor in Chicago. Because he continued to celebrate Mass and administer the other sacraments, he was excommunicated on 3 September 1856. About two years later, on 3 August 1858, O'Regan's successor, Bishop James Duggan, formally and publicly reconfirmed Chiniquy's excommunication in St. Anne.

Chiniquy had definitively left the Roman Catholic Church in 1858, and subsequently converted to Protestant Christianity in 1860. Along with many followers, he joined the Presbyterian Church in the United States of America (PCUSA). He was admitted as a Presbyterian minister on 1 February 1860. Within two years, Chiniquy, in trouble with the Presbytery of Chicago over his administration of charity funds and a college, according to Elizabeth Ann Kerr McDougall in the Dictionary of Canadian Biography, sought a new connection in order to avoid an expensive presbytery trial. The college is identified in the Seventh Biennial Report of the Superintendent of Public Instruction of the State of Illinois as Saviour's College, founded in 1860; it is listed neither in Universities and Colleges nor Academies and Seminaries of various grades and courses, but in the Theological Seminaries and Church Schools class of institutions. The report states it "is designed to supply the educational wants of the colony brought by Father Chiniquy from Canada to this State, and to prepare men who will be fitted to preach the gospel in the regions whence he came." The report also quotes a description of the school, attributed to correspondence from a Montreal newspaper, unnamed in the report, that people, also unnamed in the report, "examined the day school or college, as the people there delight to call it" and wrote that it had five classes, ranging from students learning the alphabet to students learning the "intricacies of French and English grammar, composition, and the other studies of the school, besides the elements of Algebra, Latin, and Greek."

Alexander F. Kemp was chairman of the Synod of the Canada Presbyterian Church committee that examined Chiniquy's application for admission as a minister. According to Kemp, Chiniquy was involved in both presbytery and civil court proceedings connected with the administration of charitable funds and with what Kemp described as an educational institute. The Presbytery of Chicago charged him with un-ministerial and un-Christian conduct; Chiniquy was expected to answer these charges before the presbytery. At that stage of the proceedings, he and his congregation resolved to separate from the Presbytery of Chicago and the Old School (PCUSA), and to request recognition from the Canada Presbyterian Church. The Presbytery of Chicago charged Chiniquy with misrepresenting that a real college was in operation in St. Anne. After conducting an inquiry, Kemp suggested that Chiniquy and his congregation be admitted into the Canada Presbyterian Church.

In St. Anne, a religious society was incorporated in the state that was named the "Christian Catholic Church at St. Anne". It was classified as a Protestant religious association. Two years later, when it joined the PCUSA in 1860, it took the name of "First Presbyterian Church of St. Anne".

See also

Archives 
There is a Charles Chiniquy fonds at Library and Archives Canada. The archival reference number is R7160.

References

Bibliography

 Caroline B. Brettell, Following Father Chiniquy: Immigration, Religious Schism, and Social Change in Nineteenth-Century Illinois (Southern Illinois University Press, 2015).
 Richard Lougheed, The Controversial Conversion of Charles Chiniquy, Toronto, Clements Academic, 2009.
 Richard Lougheed, Charles Chiniquy : l'homme de controverse, Toronto, Clements Academic, 2015.
 Serup Paul, Who Killed Abraham Lincoln?, Prince George, Salmova Press, 2010. 
 Marcel Trudel, Chiniquy, Trois-Rivieres, Editions du Bien Public, 1955.

External links
 Chiniquy's personal archive
 Biography at the Dictionary of Canadian Biography Online
 
 

1809 births
1899 deaths
19th-century Canadian non-fiction writers
19th-century Presbyterian ministers
19th-century Canadian Roman Catholic priests
Abraham Lincoln
American Calvinist and Reformed ministers
American evangelicals
American people of French-Canadian descent
American Presbyterian ministers
American temperance activists
Anti-Catholic activists
Anti-Catholicism in the United States
Canadian Calvinist and Reformed ministers
Canadian conspiracy theorists
Canadian evangelicals
Canadian Presbyterian ministers
Canadian temperance activists
Christian conspiracy theorists
Christian temperance movement
Critics of the Catholic Church
Converts to Calvinism from Roman Catholicism
Converts to evangelical Christianity from Roman Catholicism
French Calvinist and Reformed ministers
French evangelicals
French Quebecers
Laicized Roman Catholic priests
People excommunicated by the Catholic Church
People from Bas-Saint-Laurent
Pre-Confederation Canadian emigrants to the United States
Pre-Confederation Quebec people
Pseudohistorians